Aesculus (Carnea Group) 'Pendula', or Weeping Red Horse Chestnut, was a weeping tree and a cultivar of the Aesculus Carnea Group, the Red Horse Chestnut Group, which is a cultivar group of artificial hybrids between Aesculus pavia and A. hippocastanum. The name first appeared in the 1902 edition of the Hand-list of Trees and Shrubs of the Royal Botanic Gardens, Kew without description. No trees are known to survive of this cultivar.

Description
A weeping tree with a leader and with arching branches. Young plants are reported not to be weeping. The weeping shape only seems to appear in when older. It may be that this is not a true weeping cultivar as older Horse Chestnuts often display arching branches.

Accessions
This cultivar does not seem to have been cultivated outside England. It never seems to have been widely cultivated and no trees are known to survive.

Synonymy
Aesculus × carnea var. pendulum A.Henry (1907)

References

Aesculus
Weeping trees
Extinct cultivars